Thomas F. August (December 17, 1926 – March 9, 2005) was a Massachusetts attorney and politician who served as the 31st Mayor of Somerville, Massachusetts. August lost re-election in a three-way race with Eugene C. Brune, who won by 2,400 votes, and Michael E. Capuano, who succeeded Brune.

Early life
August was the son of John and Margaret (Reidy) August.

Education
August was a graduate of Boston University and its Boston University School of Law.

Military service
During World War II and the Korean War, August served as a Chief Pharmacists Mate in the U.S. Navy.

Death and burial
August died on March 9, 2005, in Salem, Massachusetts, and was buried at Mount Auburn Cemetery in Cambridge, Massachusetts.

References

1926 births
2005 deaths
United States Navy personnel of World War II
United States Navy personnel of the Korean War
Boston University School of Law alumni
Burials at Mount Auburn Cemetery
Politicians from Cambridge, Massachusetts
Massachusetts city council members
Massachusetts lawyers
Mayors of Somerville, Massachusetts
United States Navy chiefs
Lawyers from Cambridge, Massachusetts
20th-century American politicians
20th-century American lawyers